Camelia Malik (born April 22, 1955) is an Indonesian actress and dangdut singer. She is also known as Diva Dangdut Jaipong.

Personal life
Malik had been married to Harry Capri for 24 years when on May 6, 2013 they announced at a press conference that they had begun divorce proceedings on April 30, 2013 having been living apart for a year. Malik was married previously in 1977 to Christian singer Reynold Panggabean. The interfaith marriage ended twelve years later in 1989.

Her father, Djamaluddin Malik was a film director while her maternal half-brother, Ahmad Albar, is a rock singer.

Filmography
 Nada-nada Rindu
 Jaka Swara
 Laki-laki Pilihan
 Lorong Hitam
 Dalam Sinar Matamu
 Jangan Coba Raba-raba
 Mencari Ayah
 Para Perintis Kemerdekaan
 Gengsi Dong (1980)
 Pacar Ketinggalan Kereta (1989)

Discography
 Colak-colek (1979)
 Raba-raba (1980)
 Ceplas-ceplos
 Gengsi Dong
 Wakuncar
 Murah Meriah
 Colak Colek II
 Rekayasa Cinta (2002)

References

External links
 

1955 births
Indonesian dangdut singers
20th-century Indonesian women singers
Indonesian film actresses
Living people
Indonesian people of Pakistani descent
Indonesian people of Yemeni descent
Indonesian people of Moroccan descent
Actresses from Jakarta
Minangkabau people
Javanese people